Mark Olsen may refer to: 

 Mark V. Olsen (born 1962), U.S. screenwriter, co-creator of Big Love on HBO
 Mark S. Olsen (born 1962), New Zealand portrait artist

See also
 Marc Olsen (born 1986), Danish football (soccer) player
Mark Olssen, political theorist
 Mark Olson (disambiguation)